Roger Henry Pocklington Senhouse (189931 August 1970) was an English publisher and translator, and a peripheral member of the Bloomsbury Group of writers, intellectuals, and artists. The private letters of writer and Bloomsbury Group member Lytton Strachey reveal that Senhouse was his (last) lover, and with whom in the late ‘20s and early 1930s he had a sado-masochistic sexual relationship.

Senhouse attended both Eton College and Oxford University, where he was friends with Michael Llewelyn Davies, one of the boys upon whom Peter Pan was based. J. M. Barrie, the author of Peter Pan became legal guardian of the Llewellyn Davies boys on the death of their parents. Robert Boothby, who was a friend of Senhouse and Davies during that period and himself bisexual said in a 1976 interview that the relationship between Senhouse and Davies was "fleetingly" homosexual in nature.

In 1935, Senhouse became co-owner with Fredric Warburg of the publishing house which became Secker & Warburg, rescuing it from receivership. Senhouse translated several works by French novelist Colette, and collaborated on a translation of The Blood of Others by Simone de Beauvoir - these were published by Secker, along with major works of the era including George Orwell's Nineteen Eighty-Four and Animal Farm, and works by Theodore Roethke, Alberto Moravia, Günter Grass, Angus Wilson, Julian Gloag, and Melvyn Bragg.

See also
List of Bloomsbury Group people

References

External links
Archival Material at 
Roger Senhouse Correspondence, 1919-1931 held by Princeton University Library Special Collections

1899 births
1970 deaths
People educated at Eton College
Alumni of the University of Oxford
Publishers (people) from London
Gay men
20th-century English businesspeople